Afro-Bossa is an album by American pianist, composer and bandleader Duke Ellington recorded and released on the Reprise label in 1963.

Reception
The Allmusic review by Ken Dryden awarded the album 4 stars and stated "This is easily one of Duke Ellington's essential studio recordings of the 1960s, though it isn't as widely recognized as it ought to be".

Track listing
:All compositions by Duke Ellington except as indicated
 "Afro-Bossa" – 4:22
 "Purple Gazelle" – 2:44
 "Absinthe" (Billy Strayhorn) – 3:34
 "Moonbow" – 2:33
 "Sempre Amore" – 3:14
 "Caline (Silk Lace)" – 2:31
 "Tigress" (Strayhorn) – 3:06
 "Angu" – 2:42
 "Volupté" – 2:44
 "Bonga" – 2:49
 "Pyramid" (Ellington, Irving Gordon, Irving Mills, Juan Tizol) – 3:03
 "Eighth Veil" (Ellington, Strayhorn) – 2:48
 Recorded at Fine Studios, New York on November 29, 1962 (track 9), December 14, 1962 (track 12), December 20, 1962 (tracks 6 & 11), January 4, 1963 (track 10), and January 5, 1963  (tracks 1-5, 7 & 8).

Personnel
Duke Ellington – piano (tracks 1, 2, 4-7 & 9-11)
Billy Strayhorn – piano (tracks 3 & 8)
Ray Nance – cornet, violin
Cat Anderson, Roy Burrowes, Cootie Williams – trumpet
Lawrence Brown, Buster Cooper – trombone
Chuck Connors – bass trombone
Jimmy Hamilton – clarinet, tenor saxophone
Johnny Hodges – alto saxophone
Russell Procope – alto saxophone, clarinet
Paul Gonsalves – tenor saxophone
Harry Carney – baritone saxophone, clarinet, bass clarinet
Ernie Shepard – bass
Sam Woodyard – drums

References

Reprise Records albums
Duke Ellington albums
1963 albums